René Antoine Pijpers (15 September 1917 – 22 March 1944) was a Dutch football midfielder who was a member of the Netherlands' squad at the 1938 FIFA World Cup. However, he never made an appearance for the national team. With RFC Roermond he won the KNVB Cup in 1936 alongside his brothers Frans, Harry and Coen.

References

External links
FIFA profile

1917 births
1944 deaths
Dutch footballers
Association football midfielders
1938 FIFA World Cup players
People from Swalmen
DOSKO players
Footballers from Limburg (Netherlands)